Warming House may refer to:

 A calefactory, a common part of a medieval monastery
Warming House (Denver, Colorado), a Denver landmark